Prince Aleksander Antoni Sapieha (1773-1812) was a Polish nobleman, miecznik of the Duchy of Warsaw, naturalist, traveler, politician, chamberlain and adjutant of Emperor Napoleon I.

Children
 Anna Zofia Sapieha (1799-1864), wife of Adam Jerzy Czartoryski - "Rondo á la Krakowiak F Dur, op. 14" was dedicated to her by Frédéric Chopin.
 Leon Sapieha (1803-1878), one of the leaders of the November Uprising. Husband of Countess Jadwiga Klementyna Zamoyska.

Bibliography
 J. Skowronek, Z magnackiego gniazda do napoleońskiego wywiadu. Aleksander Sapieha, Warszawa 1992

1773 births
1812 deaths
Politicians from Strasbourg
Aleksander Antoni
19th-century Polish scientists
Polish politicians